Standard Test Data Format (STDF) is a proprietary file format for semiconductor test information originally developed by Teradyne, but it is now a de facto standard widely used throughout the semiconductor industry. It is a commonly used format produced by automatic test equipment (ATE) platforms from companies such as Cohu, Roos Instruments, Teradyne, Advantest, and others.

STDF is a binary format, but can be converted either to an ASCII format known as ATDF or to a tab delimited text file. Decoding the STDF variable length binary field data format to extract ASCII text is non-trivial as it involves a detailed comprehension of the STDF specification, the current (2007) version 4 specification being over 100 pages in length. Software tools exist for processing STDF generated files and performing statistical analysis on a population of tested devices.

References

External links

Specification 
 STDF Version 4 specification

Standards developing organizations 
 IEEE Test Technology Standards Group/Committee

External libraries 
 C library for processing STDF related data
 Java library for processing STDF related data
 .NET library from reading and writing STDF files
 LabVIEW library for processing STDF related data
 Python module under active development
 Python module to process STDF files (only STDFv4 format)
 Python module to process STDF files (both STDFv3 and STDFv4 format)
 R based open source data analysis tool for STDF and other ATE formatted data
 JavaScript package to process STDF files

Additional links 

 STDF resources
 STDF Viewer/Editor (commercial software)
Computer file formats
Hardware testing file formats